Maria Albertina da Costa Dias Pereira (born 26 April 1965 in Miragaia) is a former Portuguese long-distance runner. She competed in three consecutive Summer Olympics for her native country, starting in 1988. She was the first female Portuguese world champion in cross country running, having won the long race at the 1993 IAAF World Cross Country Championships.

Career
She finished tenth in the 10,000 metres at the 1988 Summer Olympics. Her first real successes came in cross country running: she won the long race individual silver and the team bronze at the 1990 IAAF World Cross Country Championships. Dias won the Eurocross meeting in 1991 and went on to take sixth place at the 1991 Cross Country Championships. Competing at the world indoors for the first time, she finished in fourth place in the 3000 metres at the IAAF World Indoor Championships. At her first outdoor World Championships in Athletics in 1991, she failed to finish in the 10,000 metres final. Her second world medal, a bronze, came at the 1992 IAAF World Cross Country Championships long race.

Dias attended her second Olympics, the 1992 Barcelona Games and finished in 13th at the 10,000 metres final. She won the 1993 IAAF World Cross Country Championships long race the following year, becoming the first Portuguese woman to ever complete the feat. She won the Olympic Medal Nobre Guedes as a result. She failed to match this feat at the 1993 World Championships in Athletics as she finished seventh in the 10,000 m. A fifth-place finish at the 1994 IAAF World Cross Country Championships was enough for a team gold with Portugal, led by Conceição Ferreira. She began competing in the half marathon and took fourth place at the 1994 IAAF World Half Marathon Championships.

She took part in her third World Athletics Championships but again failed to finish the 10,000 metres final at the 1995 Championships. After a fifth-place finish at the 1996 European Cross Country Championships, she ran in her third Olympics for Portugal – this time in the Olympic marathon race. She finished in 27th place, out-performed by compatriot Manuela Machado, who took 7th.

An eleventh place at the 1998 IAAF World Half Marathon Championships and seventh place with a team gold at the 1998 European Cross Country Championships brought a close to her career.

International competitions

References

General
 Profile

External links
In-depth article on 1993 World Cross Country Championships from Irish Times

1965 births
Living people
Sportspeople from Porto
Portuguese female marathon runners
Portuguese female long-distance runners
Olympic athletes of Portugal
Athletes (track and field) at the 1988 Summer Olympics
Athletes (track and field) at the 1992 Summer Olympics
Athletes (track and field) at the 1996 Summer Olympics
World Athletics Championships athletes for Portugal
World Athletics Cross Country Championships winners